Keyondrei Samuel "Kiwi" Gardner (born April 7, 1993) is an American professional basketball player for the Illawarra Hawks of the NBL1 East. He became an Internet sensation via YouTube in 2011. Gardner played one season of college basketball for Midland College before beginning his professional career in 2013.

High school career
Gardner was raised in the Maxwell Park neighborhood in Oakland, California and began playing basketball at the age of four. From 2007 to 2010, Gardner attended Manteca High School in Manteca, California. As a sophomore in 2008–09, he averaged 19.8 points, 6.0 assists, 2.1 rebounds and 2.2 steals per game as he helped the Buffaloes finish with a 24–4 record. As a junior in 2009–10, he averaged 24 points, 3.8 assists, 3.9 rebounds and 3.5 steals as he helped the Buffaloes finish a 23–6 record.

In 2010, Gardner transferred to Westwind Preparatory Academy in Phoenix, Arizona. He did not meet the eligibility requirements of the Arizona Interscholastic Association because of transferring in his senior year, so he did not play on WPA's State Championship High School team that year.  Instead, he played on WPA's prep team. Gardner was chosen to participate in the NCAA's High School Slam Dunk contest during the Final Four Tournament, where the crowd watched the same showmanship that has led to hundreds of thousands of hits on his YouTube highlight videos. He averaged 23.7 points, seven assists, four steals and four rebounds per game during the 2010–11 season, leading Westwind to a 30–2 record and a state title.

College career
Gardner committed to Providence College, but he never gained eligibility to play. He subsequently sat out the 2011–12 season and transferred to Midland College, where he played nine games during the 2012–13 season. Following the season, he declared for the NBA draft.

Professional career
After going undrafted in the 2013 NBA draft, Gardner spent the 2013–14 season in the NBA Development League with the Santa Cruz Warriors. After a stint with the Golden State Warriors during the 2014 NBA Summer League, Gardner returned to Santa Cruz for the 2014–15 season and helped the Warriors win the D-League championship.

In 2015, Gardner played in Mexico for Pioneros de Los Mochis. For the 2015–16 season, he played in Saudi Arabia with Al-Ansar. He scored 74 points in a game outside Mecca.

After a preseason stint with the Windy City Bulls in November 2016, Gardner joined the Westports Malaysia Dragons of the ASEAN Basketball League in February 2017. After one season, Gardner played in lower professional and semi-professional leagues in China, Japan, and Hong Kong.

On February 7, 2020, Gardner was acquired by the Santa Cruz Warriors, returning to the franchise for a second stint. He played 11 games to finish the 2019–20 NBA G League season.

In March 2022, Gardner moved to Australia to play for the Illawarra Hawks of the NBL1 East. He was named the 2022 NBL1 East MVP.

References

External links
 NBL1 profile
 NBA D-League profile
 

1993 births
Living people
American expatriate basketball people in Australia
American expatriate basketball people in Malaysia
American expatriate basketball people in Mexico
American expatriate basketball people in Saudi Arabia
American men's basketball players
Basketball players from California
Kuala Lumpur Dragons players
Midland Chaps basketball players
People from Manteca, California
Pioneros de Los Mochis players
Point guards
Santa Cruz Warriors players